The 2021-2022 Le Mans Virtual Series was the first season of the Le Mans Virtual Series which is an Esports endurance series. The five-event season began at the Autodromo Nazionale di Monza on 25 September 2021 and finished at the Circuit de la Sarthe for the 24 Hours of Le Mans Virtual on 15–16 January 2022 which took place at Studio Gabriel, in Paris, France.

The series is open for Le Mans Prototype (LMP2) and Le Mans Grand Touring Endurance (LMGTE) classes.

Calendar

Entries
The entry list was divided into two categories of vehicles: LMP2 and GTE. There are 21 teams in the LMP class and 17 in the GTE category.

LMP2 
All cars in the LMP2 class used the Gibson GK428 V8 engine.

LMGTE

Results

Bold indicates overall winner.

Teams' Championships 
Points are awarded according to the following structure:

LMP2 

‡ – Half points for the 8 Hours of Nürburgring as the race was red flagged prematurely.

LMGTE 

‡ – Half points for the 8 Hours of Nürburgring as the race was red flagged prematurely.

Notes

References

External links
 

Virtual
Le Mans
2022 in esports